Targitaos (Ancient Greek: ,;), or Scythes (Ancient Greek: ,;), was a Scythian god who was the first of the Scythians ancestor and their first king according to the Scythian mythology.

Name
The Greek name  is the Hellenised form of the Scythian language name , which means “whose might is far-reaching.”

The Greek name name  is the Hellenised form of the Scythian language name , which is the endonym of the Scythians.

Role

According to the various versions of the Scythian genealogical myth,  fathered the ancestors of the Scythians with the Snake-Legged Goddess.

Identification

Regional variants

Sanerges

Iconography
 is the same figure who appears in Scythian art as the masculine figure facing Artimpasa in her depictions as a seated goddess.

's role in these scenes also consisted of representing a deified mortal who was identified with him, the Scythian king, who thus was given  by identifying him with his divine ancestor.

Although the identity of the figure holding the  has been suggested to be , it most likely represented .

See also

References

Sources 

 
 
 

Scythian mythology
Earth gods
Legendary progenitors